Get Up with It is a compilation album by American jazz trumpeter, bandleader, and composer Miles Davis. Released by Columbia Records on November 22, 1974, it compiled songs Davis had recorded in sessions between 1970 and 1974, including those for the studio albums Jack Johnson (1971) and On the Corner (1972). In The Rolling Stone Album Guide (2004), J. D. Considine described the compilation's music as "worldbeat fusion".

Recordings 
"He Loved Him Madly" was recorded by Davis as his tribute to then-recently deceased Duke Ellington, who used to tell his audiences "I love you madly." British musician Brian Eno cited it as an influence on his work in ambient music in the liner notes to his 1982 release On Land.

One track, "Honky Tonk", was recorded in 1970 with musicians such as John McLaughlin and Herbie Hancock. "Red China Blues" had been recorded in 1972 before On the Corner, while "Rated X" and "Billy Preston" were recorded later that year with the band heard on In Concert. The remaining tracks were from 1973 and 1974 sessions with his current band, including Pete Cosey.

Critical reception 

Reviewing for Rolling Stone in 1975, Stephen Davis applauded Davis' adventurousness and direction of his rhythm band, who he called a "who's who of Seventies jazz-rock". The same year, Robert Christgau wrote in The Village Voice that although Davis' recent albums have sounded slapdash with "noodling over a pick-up rhythm section," Get Up with It is still listenable "since it contains over two hours of what sometimes sounds like bullshit: it's not exactly music to fill the mind. Just the room." Years later in Christgau's Record Guide: Rock Albums of the Seventies (1981), he said only two of the six shorter songs—"Maiyisha" and "Honky Tonk"—make up "more than good" background music, but the two long pieces "are brilliant: 'He Loved Him Madly,' a tribute to Duke Ellington as elegant African internationalist, and 'Calypso Frelimo,' a Caribbean dance broken into sections that seem to follow with preordained emotional logic."

For the album's 2000 reissue, Alternative Press published a review calling it "essential ... the overlooked classic of psychedelic soul and outlandish improv ... representing the high water mark of [Davis'] experiments in the fusion of rock, funk, electronica and jazz". Stylus Magazines Chris Smith said it is "not an easy album to write, let alone think, about. It’s a bit more of an anything-goes hodgepodge than it is a sprawling masterwork, and is probably written about the least of all Miles’ electric work." Andy Beta of Pitchfork described Get Up with It as a "black funk dreamscape" and observed that "Each song careens between extremes, as Miles presages everything still to come: ambient, no wave, world beat, jungle, new jack swing, post-rock, even hinting at the future sound of R&B and chart-topping pop". He praised Davis' adoption of the electric organ for opening up new avenues of musical expression, remarking that "Rather than run the voodoo down, now Miles could conjure it all by himself".

Track listing
All compositions by Miles Davis.

Personnel

"He Loved Him Madly"  

Recorded Columbia Studio E, New York City June 19 or 20, 1974

 Miles Davis — electric trumpet with wah-wah, organ
 Dave Liebman — alto flute
 Pete Cosey — electric guitar
 Reggie Lucas — electric guitar
 Dominique Gaumont — electric guitar
 Michael Henderson — bass guitar
 Al Foster — drums
 James Mtume — percussion

"Maiysha"  

Recorded Columbia Studio E, New York City October 7, 1974

 Miles Davis — electric trumpet with wah-wah, organ
 Sonny Fortune — flute
 Pete Cosey — electric guitar
 Reggie Lucas — electric guitar
 Dominique Gaumont — electric guitar
 Michael Henderson — bass guitar
 Al Foster — drums
 James Mtume — percussion

"Honky Tonk"  

Recorded Columbia Studio E, New York City May 19, 1970

 Miles Davis — trumpet
 Steve Grossman — soprano saxophone
 John McLaughlin — electric guitar
 Keith Jarrett — electric piano
 Herbie Hancock — clavinet
 Michael Henderson — bass guitar
 Billy Cobham — drums
 Airto Moreira — percussion

"Rated X"  

Recorded Columbia Studio E, New York City September 6, 1972

 Miles Davis — organ
 Cedric Lawson — electric piano
 Reggie Lucas — electric guitar
 Khalil Balakrishna — electric sitar
 Michael Henderson — bass guitar
 Al Foster — drums
 James Mtume — percussion
 Badal Roy — tabla

"Calypso Frelimo" 

Recorded Columbia Studio E, New York City September 17, 1973

 Miles Davis — electric trumpet with wah-wah, electric piano, organ
 Dave Liebman — flute
 John Stubblefield — soprano saxophone
 Pete Cosey — electric guitar
 Reggie Lucas — electric guitar
 Michael Henderson — bass guitar
 Al Foster — drums
 James Mtume — percussion

"Red China Blues" 

Recorded Columbia Studio E, New York City March 9, 1972

 Miles Davis — electric trumpet with wah-wah
 Lester Chambers — harmonica
 Cornell Dupree — electric guitar
 Michael Henderson — bass guitar
 Al Foster — drums
 Bernard Purdie — drums
 James Mtume — percussion
 Wade Marcus — brass arrangement
 Billy Jackson — rhythm arrangement

"Mtume" 

Recorded Columbia Studio E, New York City October 7, 1974

 Miles Davis — electric trumpet with wah-wah, organ
 Pete Cosey — electric guitar
 Reggie Lucas — electric guitar
 Dominique Gaumont — electric guitar
 Michael Henderson — bass guitar
 Al Foster — drums
 James Mtume — percussion
 Sonny Fortune — flute

"Billy Preston" 

Recorded Columbia Studio E, New York City December 8, 1972

 Miles Davis — electric trumpet with wah-wah
 Carlos Garnett — soprano saxophone
 Cedric Lawson — fender rhodes electric piano
 Reggie Lucas — electric guitar
 Khalil Balakrishna — electric sitar
 Michael Henderson — bass guitar
 Al Foster — drums
 James Mtume — percussion
 Badal Roy — tabla

References

External links 
 

1974 compilation albums
Miles Davis compilation albums
Albums produced by Teo Macero
Jazz fusion compilation albums
Columbia Records compilation albums
Worldbeat albums